World Music Master Artist
Watching Victor Espínola, you embark on a rhythmic journey through a dichotomy of enlightenment and mystery. 

Espínola is an enigma. He employs the Paraguan Harp, a cultural emblem of his homeland, and transforms it into a melodic phenomenon, creating music that transcends cultures, ages, and genres.

Victor is a celebrated virtuoso throughout the world, traveling as a featured artist on multiple tours with iconic musician and composer, Yanni, for over fifteen years.

The range of Victor’s talent is not only confined to the harp, equally mesmerizing on guitar and vocals. His accomplished work as a composer and recording artist, creating original music and scores,  make him a sought after collaborator with artists, ensembles, and symphony orchestras around the world.

A spellbinding guest artist for any symphony orchestra. Compelling full-length solo or ensemble concerts, including, Forbidden Saints, a musical journey of world music featuring violin, cello, duduk, and harp.

Discography
Walking on the Wind
I Belong to You
Forbidden Angel
Army of angels
Baila morena /Paye
Forbidden saints live in concert
Sacred land (live in Armenia)
Harout Pamboukjian and forbidden saints live at the Dolby Theatre
Yanni live the concert event
Yanni.The dream concert (live from the great Pyramids)
Thanasis Vassilopoulos feat Victor Espinola (Para bailar)-(single)
Thanasis Vassilopoulos feat Victor Espinola (Gitana Morena)-(single)
Tonci Huljic and Madre Badessa feat Victor Espinola (Kisa)-(single)

References

External links

Official website
Víctor Espínola on Instagram
Víctor Espínola on YouTube

Year of birth missing (living people)
Living people
Paraguayan harpists